The Air Museum is an aviation museum of the Portuguese Air Force located at Sintra Air Base and with spaces at Ovar and Alverca.

History 
The museum dates back to the Aero Clube de Portugal in 1909 and was created in 1968 in a former Military Aviation hangar at Alverca. Opening for the first time to the public on July 1, 1971.

In 2009, due to the growth of the collection, a new site at the Sintra Air Base complex was created for the museum and part of the collection was transferred there.

Aircraft on display

Sintra 

 14-bis
 Demoiselle XX
 de Havilland Hornet Moth (s/n CR-AAC/111)
 Blériot XI
 de Havilland DH89A Dragon Rapide (s/n 2307)
 Sikorsky UH-19 (s/n 9101)
 Beech AT-11 Kansan (s/n 2504)
 Supermarine Spitfire HF IXc (s/n ML255/MR-Z)
 North American F-86F Sabre (s/n 5320)
 North American F-86F Sabre (s/n 5361)
 Fiat G.91R/3 (s/n 5445)
 Fiat G.91R/4 (s/n 5407)
 Douglas C-47A Dakota (s/n 6157)
 Douglas C-47A Dakota (s/n CS-TDA)
 Dornier Do 27 A4 (s/n 3357)
 Dornier Do 27 A4 (s/n 3487)
 Jurca MJ2B Tempête
 Dassault/Dornier Alpha Jet A (s/n 15209)
 Dassault/Dornier Alpha Jet A (s/n 15224)
 Caudron G.III
 de Havilland DH-82A Tiger Moth (s/n 102)
 de Havilland DH-82A Tiger Moth (s/n 111)
 de Havilland Chipmunk Mk.20 (s/n 1305)
 CASA C-212-100 (s/n 16508)
 CASA C-212-100 (s/n 16524)
 Cessna T-37C (s/n 2420)
 Cessna T-37C (gate guard) (s/n 2424)
 Cessna T-37C (s/n 2430)
 Lockheed P-2V-5 Neptune (s/n 4711)
 Lockheed RT-33A T-Bird (s/n 1916)
 Lockheed T-33A Silver Star (s/n 1923)
 Lockheed T-33A Silver Star (s/n 1926)
 Northrop T-38A Talon (s/n 2605)
 Sud Aviation SE3130 Alouette II (s/n 9217)
 Sud Aviation SE3160 Alouette III (s/n 19384)
 Avro 631 Cadet
 North American AT-16 Harvard III (s/n 1517)
 North American T-6J Texan (s/n 1737)
 Aerospatiale SA330S-1 Puma (s/n 19512)
 Beechcraft F33A Bonanza (s/n CS-A7L)
 Boeing 707-382B (cockpit) (s/n 9T-MSS)
 Junkers Ju 52/3m g3e (s/n 6304)
 Nord N2502A Noratlas (s/n 6403)
 Cessna Skymaster FTB-337G (s/n 13701)
 Lockheed P-3P Orion (s/n 14806)
 Max Holste M.H.1521 Broussard (s/n 3304)
 Piper PA-18 (L-21B) Super Cub (s/n 3218)

Alverca 

 Auster D-5/160 (s/n 3564)
 De Havilland DHC-1 Chipmunk (s/n 1376)
 Fairey III D Mk.2 (s/n 17)
 Maurice Farman MF-4
 Grumman G-44 Widgeon (s/n 129)
 Grunau Baby (s/n CS-PAE)
 Hawker Hurricane IIIb
 Jodel D9 Bébé (s/n CS-AXA)
 North American F-86F Sabre (s/n 5319)
 North American T-6J Texan (s/n 1769)
 Northrop T-38A Talon (s/n 2601)
 Piper PA-18 (L-21B) Super Cub (s/n 3212)
 Cessna Skymaster FTB-337G (s/n 13709)
 LTV A-7P Corsair II (s/n 15508)
 Nikus Miniplane
 Hawker Hurricane IIc (s/n 591/RV-J)  (not visible in visit on 30 Jan 2023)
 Cessna T-37C Tweety Bird (s/n 2420)
 Nord N2501 Noratlas (s/n 6420)  (not visible in visit on 30 Jan 2023)
 Douglas C-54A Skymaster (s/n 6606)   (possibly in external storage on main FAP base, 30 Jan 2023)
 Sud Aviation SE3130 Alouette II (s/n 9216)
 Sud Aviation SE3160 Alouette III (s/n 9258 main cabin, composite with s/n 9265 boom)

Ovar 

 Auster D-5/160 (s/n 3208)
 CASA C-212-100
 Cessna T-37C (s/n 2427)
 Fiat G.91R/3 (s/n 5452)
 Northrop T-38A Talon (s/n 2603)
 Piper PA-18 (L-21B) Super Cub
 Cessna Skymaster FTB-337G
 Republic F-84G Thunderjet (s/n 5201)
 LTV TA-7P Corsair II (s/n 15550)

Stored aircraft 
 Mikoyan-Gurevich MiG-21PFM Fishbed (s/n 6614), transferred from the Polish Aviation Museum
 Dassault Mirage IIIR (s/n 313)
 Canadair CF-104D Starfighter (s/n 104750)
Max Holste MH-1521 Broussard (s/n 3301)
Max Holste MH-1521 Broussard (s/n 3303)

See also 

 Portuguese Air Force
 OGMA
 List of aerospace museums
 List of aircraft of the Portuguese Air Force
 Royal Museum of the Armed Forces and of Military History

References

Notes

Bibliography

External links 
 Força Aérea Portuguesa – Museu do Ar, official website 
 Museu do Ar 

Air force museums
Transport museums in Portugal
History museums in Portugal
Portuguese Air Force
Culture in Sintra
Museums in Lisbon District
Museums established in 1968
1968 establishments in Portugal
Military of Portugal